Domingo Manami Bomari (born 22 May 1995) is an Equatoguinean futsal player who plays as a winger for Leones Vegetarianos FC and the Equatorial Guinea national futsal team.

International career
Manami played for Equatorial Guinea at the 2016 Africa Futsal Cup of Nations qualification and was named for the 2020 Africa Futsal Cup of Nations.

International goals
Scores and results list Jamaica's goal tally first

References

1995 births
Living people
Equatoguinean men's futsal players